Doris Grove is an American world record breaking glider pilot, flight instructor, and a member of the U.S. Soaring Hall of Fame. She was an early pioneer of ridge soaring in the Ridge-and-valley Appalachians in the 1970s, ultimately setting three world records flying gliders there, and becoming the first woman to earn the FAI 1000 km Diploma. She was also a stunt co-pilot in the 1999 film The Thomas Crown Affair.

Grove currently lives near State College, Pennsylvania with her husband Thomas Knauff, another hall of fame glider pilot. They owned and operated the Ridge Soaring Gliderport in Julian, Pennsylvania, which they founded in 1975. Sadly, the glider port closed in 2022.

World glider records

Single-place glider, Feminine
Out-and-return distance: 731.27 km, 7 April 1979, Ridge Soaring Gliderport, Julian, Pennsylvania, Schleicher ASW 19
Out-and-return distance: 1000.86 km, 11 Mar 1980, Ridge Soaring Gliderport, Julian, Pennsylvania, Schleicher ASW 19
Out-and-return distance: 1127.68 km, 28 September 1981, Piper Memorial Airport, Lock Haven, Pennsylvania, Schempp-Hirth Nimbus 2

Source: Fédération Aéronautique Internationale.

Other flying accomplishments
1000 K Diploma, first woman, U.S. #12 (Int #24) 1980
SSA Exceptional Achievement Award 1981
Eaton Trophy (with T. Knauff) 2000
Certificate of Appreciation (with T. Knauff) 2005
Source: Soaring Hall of Fame.

Books authored
Federal Aviation Regulations for Glider Pilots, 1996
Accident Prevention Manual for Glider Flight Instructors, with Thomas Knauff, 2nd edition, 1993, (No ISBN)
Accident Prevention Manual for Glider Pilots, with Thomas Knauff, 1992.
Judgment Training Manual for Glider Pilots, with Doris Grove, 1985. OCLC 61776977
Glider Basics from Solo to License with Thomas Knauff, et al., 1st ed, 1984.

References 

American aviators
Aviation pioneers
Gliding in the United States
Glider flight record holders
People from State College, Pennsylvania
Glider pilots
Living people
American aviation record holders
Year of birth missing (living people)
American flight instructors
American women flight instructors
American women aviation record holders
21st-century American women